Legendary Entertainment (also known as Legendary Pictures or simply Legendary) is an American film production and mass media company based in Burbank, California, founded by Thomas Tull along with co-founders Scott Mednick and William Fay in 2000. The company has collaborated with the major studios, including Warner Bros. Pictures, Universal Pictures,  Sony Pictures Entertainment and Paramount Pictures as well as streaming services, such as Netflix and Hulu. Since 2016, Legendary has been a subsidiary of the Chinese conglomerate Wanda Group and Apollo.

History 
Thomas Tull founded Legendary Entertainment along with co-founders Scott Mednick and William Fay after raising $500 million from private equity firms. It was one of the first companies of its kind to pair major motion picture production with major Wall Street private equity and hedge fund investors, including ABRY Partners, AIG Direct Investments, Bank of America Capital Investors, Columbia Capital, Falcon Investment Advisors, and M/C Venture Partners. Legendary Pictures, Inc. was incorporated in California in 2000 and in 2005 it signed an agreement with Warner Bros. to co-produce and co-finance up to 40 films over seven years. In 2010, Tull, Fidelity Investments, and Fortress Investment Group bought all the shares of the original investors. The buyout also included a $25 million investment by Orange Sky Golden Harvest Entertainment. Following the transaction, Tull became the largest shareholder, thus enabling him to more easily direct the company's operations. Golden Harvest later sold its stake in the company for $30 million. In 2011, Accel Partners bought $40 million-worth of shares and Accel partner Jim Breyer joined the company's board of directors. That same year the company was reported to have been valued at more than $1 billion. Willian Fay left in September of 2011. In September 2011, Chief Creative Officer Jon Jashni was appointed to the new position of President. In December 2012, Waddell & Reed bought around 20% of Legendary's shares for $443 million.

In July 2013, Legendary reached an agreement with Universal Pictures in which it would market, co-finance, and distribute Legendary's films for five years starting in 2014, the year that Legendary's similar agreement with Warner Bros. expired. In October 2014, SoftBank bought $250 million shares in Legendary for a 10% stake. The transaction increased the company's total value to around $3 billion.

In 2014, Legendary acquired the television producer Asylum Entertainment, which made ESPN's 30 for 30 and miniseries The Kennedys, for $100 million, but Asylum Entertainment will continue operating as a separate company.

On January 11, 2016, Chinese conglomerate Wanda Group announced that it had concluded an agreement with shareholders to acquire Legendary Entertainment for $3.5 billion, making it the largest acquisition of an American media company by a Chinese firm.

On January 17, 2017, it was announced that Tull had exited as Legendary Entertainment CEO. He was replaced by the senior vice president of Wanda's cultural industry group, Jack Gao, as interim CEO.

On October 17, 2017, it was reported that Gao stepped down from his positions at Legendary Entertainment and Wanda Group. The resignation comes after an announcement by Wanda's chairman Wang Jianlin earlier that year that Wanda would refocus its investments onto the Chinese domestic market in an attempt to "actively respond to the call of the country". This, in turn, is thought to be a consequence of the Chinese government banning Chinese banks from providing loans to Wanda Group's foreign operations, which was intended to stop the firm's offshore acquisition plans.

On December 5, 2017, it was announced that Joshua Grode had been named as Legendary Entertainment CEO.

On August 13, 2018, following the box office failure for many films, such as Skyscraper and Crimson Peak, the distribution deal between Legendary and Universal ended and a new agreement was reached to return to Warner Bros. Pictures.

In December 2020, Variety and Deadline Hollywood reported that Legendary Entertainment, financiers, and talent with backend deals were not pleased with WarnerMedia's multi-release plans and non-transparent intentions. Legendary was not given advanced notice of the multi-release decision nor given a say in how Dune and Godzilla vs. Kong would be distributed. The studio planned to have discussions with Warner Bros. regarding a more "generous deal" however legal action was considered. A few weeks later, Deadline reported that the film could keep its HBO Max release but only if Warner Bros. matches Netflix's $250 million bid. In January 2021, The Hollywood Reporter revealed that a legal battle was averted due to Legendary and WarnerMedia nearing an agreement to keep the film's simultaneous release.

On April 30, 2021, the company hired LionTree Advisors to explore possible deals, including the possibility of merging with a SPAC, making acquisitions, or finding partners. On July 22, 2021, it was announced that Legendary is looking for a merger instead of a SPAC. On January 31, 2022, a minority stake in Legendary was sold to Apollo Global Management, with Wanda still remaining the majority owner.

In August 2022, following the lapse of their deal with Warner Bros., Legendary Entertainment began seeking a new partnership, with Sony Pictures and Paramount Pictures among the companies interested.

In November 2022, Legendary Entertainment reached an agreement with Sony Pictures in which it would market, co-finance, and distribute Legendary's films with the exception of China where Legendary East will handle all marketing and distribution on its movies. Sony would also handle home entertainment and TV distribution for the Legendary titles it distributes. However, the partnership pact does not include Dune: Part Two and the untitled Godzilla vs. Kong sequel as Legendary would continue to remain in business for Warner Bros. Pictures. Legendary would also continue to partner with other companies for streaming, such as Netflix, as Sony does not have a streaming service.

Divisions and ventures 
In addition to producing American films, Legendary Entertainment has announced various other business endeavors.

Legendary Digital Networks 

In 2009, the company announced the establishment of a digital division, to be headed by Kathy Vrabeck, that would primarily focus on game development, a move which surprised many industry analysts because of the film industry's previous disengagement with the video game industry. The goal of the division was reoriented in 2012 with the acquisition of Nerdist Industries, LLC, a pop culture blog with an eponymous podcast. Nerdist founder Chris Hardwick announced that he and his partner Peter Levin (founder of GeekChicDaily) would still have complete editorial autonomy and that they would become the new presidents of the digital division, with Levin heading digital strategy and the digital content. In 2014, Legendary acquired both Geek & Sundry, Inc., a YouTube channel and production company, and the website Amy Poehler's Smart Girls. On June 10, 2016, LDN announced a subscription streaming service, Alpha, which will include programming from both Nerdist and Geek & Sundry. The Alpha service was shut down on March 31, 2019.

In July 2020, Legendary laid off 30% of the LDN staff. Variety reported that "there was a sense that the operations were a money drain on the company’s profitable film and television operations. Those cuts were accelerated by the onset of COVID-19, which has resulted in layoffs and furloughs across the entertainment industry". The Hollywood Reporter reported that "the digital brands have become less important to the strategic direction of Legendary in recent years as the online content business has shifted away from the networks that grew big during the early heyday of YouTube stardom. Legendary Digital is not a moneymaker for the business the way its core film and TV divisions are". In April 2021, CBR reported that "Geek & Sundry as an original content producer hasn't exactly been operational for a couple of years".

Legendary Comics 

In 2010, the company announced the launch of a comic book division called Legendary Comics, LLC under the direction of editor-in-chief Bob Schreck. The first graphic novel published by the company was Holy Terror by Frank Miller, which was released in 2011.

Legendary Television and Digital Media 

In 2011, the company announced the creation of Legendary Television to focus on developing television productions. The division was headed by Jeremy Elice and a co-financing contract with Warner Bros. Television was signed. However, in 2012, Legendary decided to postpone its expansion into television and put the division on hold while restructuring; the contract with Warner Bros. was terminated and Elice left the company.

In 2013, Legendary purchased film marketing agency Five33 Ltd. The company, which in the past has worked on marketing campaigns for various studios, will now work exclusively on marketing Legendary's films. Also in 2013, Legendary invested in hiring former head of Warner Bros. Television, Bruce Rosenblum, to head Legendary's television and digital media operations. In December 2013, Legendary acquired television production company Asylum Entertainment, best known for producing sports programming and reality and scripted television series such as Beyond the Glory and The Kennedys.

Legendary East 
In 2011, the company announced the formation of Legendary East Ltd., a joint venture film production company based in Hong Kong. The purpose of the company is to co-produce films with Chinese companies to bypass Chinese quotas on foreign film releases in the country.

Under an initial agreement with Chinese film distributor Huayi Brothers International, half of the company was to be owned by the shell corporation Paul Y. Engineering Group, 40% was to be owned by Legendary Entertainment (through holding companies such as Legendary Asian Pacific, LLC or Legendary East Holdings, LLC), and 10% was to owned by the Huayi Brothers International. Legendary East initially hoped to produce one to two globally marketed English-language films per year and finance a quarter of the production of an additional two films per year. The company hoped to raise US$220.5 million through the sale of stock of Paul Y. Engineering Group on the Hong Kong Stock Exchange by the end of 2011. However, because financing did not meet the targeted goal, Legendary East scrapped the deal with Huayi Brothers International and continued its efforts to secure financing in 2012.

In 2013, Legendary East announced a new agreement with China Film Group. Under the new agreement, the two companies will co-produce multiple films over a three-year period.

Filmography

Television

References

External links 

 

2000 establishments in California
2016 mergers and acquisitions
American companies established in 2000
American subsidiaries of foreign companies
Companies based in Burbank, California
Dalian Wanda Group
Film production companies of the United States
Mass media companies established in 2000